Daasi is a 1981 Indian Hindi-language drama film directed by Raj Khosla and produced by Subhash Verma. The film stars Sanjeev Kumar, Rekha, Moushumi Chatterjee, and Rakesh Roshan. The film's music is by Ravindra Jain. The film was released on 26 June 1981. It was one of several films by Khosla centred around the character of the other woman.

Plot 

The story of the film revolves around an orphaned girl Mangla who faces one heartbreak after another.

Cast 
 Rekha
 Sanjeev Kumar
 Moushumi Chatterjee
 Leela Mishra
 Rakesh Roshan

Production 
The film was shot in 1980. Rekha left the film to shoot for Silsila and returned to dub for Daasi right afterwards.

Themes 
Daasi was one of several films by Khosla centred around the character of the other woman. Like Khosla's previous film Main Tulsi Tere Aangan Ki, the male character is seen to be torn between the wife and lover. Caste hierarchy is also a key theme in the film.

Soundtrack 
Songs of the film were written and composed by Ravindra Jain.

Reception 
The film did not do well at the box office.

References

External links 
 

1980s Hindi-language films
1981 drama films
1981 films
Films directed by Raj Khosla
Films scored by Ravindra Jain
Indian drama films